Neptunium silicide is a binary inorganic compound of neptunium and silicon with the chemical formula . The compound forms crystals and does not dissolve in water.

Synthesis
Heating neptunium trifluoride with powdered silicon in vacuum:

Physical properties
Neptunium silicide forms crystals of tetragonal crystal system, space group I41/amd, cell parameters: a = 0.396 nm, c = 1.367 nm, Z = 4.

Neptunium disilicide does not dissolve in water.

Chemical properties
Neptunium disilicide reacts with HCl:

References

Neptunium compounds
Silicon compounds
Inorganic compounds
Silicides